This is a list of previous cast members from Days of Our Lives, an American soap opera on the NBC network.

Previous cast members

See also
List of Days of Our Lives cast members

References

Days of our Lives
Cast members